was a Japanese haiku poet from what is now part of the city of Fuefuki, Yamanashi, Japan. He was chief editor of Unmo until his death, upon which his son, the prominent haiku poet Ryuta Iida, took over as the editor of Unmo.

Partial bibliography
Sanro shū, (The Mountain Hat Collection, 1932)
Reishi, (The Ten-Thousand-Year Mushroom, 1940)
Shinzō, (The Mind’s Eye, 1947)
Sekkyō, (Snow Gorge, 1951), 
Kakyō no kiri, (Fog and My Native Land, 1956).

References
Marcombe Shiffert, Yūki Sawa: "Anthology of Modern Japanese Poetry", Neuauflage Tuttle Publishing, 1972, S. 186
Patricia Donegan: "Haiku Mind: 108 Poems to Cultivate Awareness and Open Your Heart", Neuauflage Shambhala Publications, 2010, S. 172
Yuzuru Miura: "Classic Haiku: A Master's Selection", Neuauflage Tuttle Publishing, 1991, S. 34

1885 births
1962 deaths
Writers from Yamanashi Prefecture
20th-century Japanese poets
Japanese male poets
20th-century Japanese male writers
Japanese haiku poets